= Nurses Residence =

Building in Manhattan, New York

- Interactive map of the Nurses Residence area

General information
- Location: Rockefeller University, New York City, United States
- Coordinates: 40°45′43.8″N 73°57′19″W

The Nurses Residence is a building on the Rockefeller University campus in Manhattan, New York City.
